Philip Chapman Lesh (born March 15, 1940) is an American musician and a founding member of the Grateful Dead, with whom he played bass guitar throughout their 30-year career.

After the band's disbanding in 1995, Lesh continued the tradition of Grateful Dead family music with side project Phil Lesh and Friends, which paid homage to the Dead's music by playing their originals, common covers, and the songs of the members of his band. Lesh operated a music venue called Terrapin Crossroads. He scaled back his touring regimen in 2014 but continues to perform with Phil Lesh & Friends at select venues. From 2009 to 2014, he performed in Furthur alongside former Grateful Dead bandmate Bob Weir.

Background 
Lesh was born in Berkeley, California, United States, and started out as a violin player. While enrolled at Berkeley High School he switched to trumpet and participated in all of the school's music-related extracurricular activities. Studying the instrument under Bob Hansen, conductor of the symphonic Golden Gate Park Band, he developed a keen interest in avant-garde classical music and free jazz. After attending San Francisco State University for a semester, Lesh was unable to secure a favorable position in the school's band or orchestra and determined that he was not ready to pursue a higher education. Upon dropping out, he successfully auditioned for the renowned Sixth Army Band (then stationed at the Presidio of San Francisco) with the assistance of Hansen, but was ultimately determined to be unfit for military service.

Shortly thereafter, he enrolled at the College of San Mateo, where he wrote charts for the community college's well-regarded big band and ascended to the first trumpet chair. (A snippet of tape of Lesh on trumpet at CSM can be heard on "Born Cross-Eyed" from the Grateful Dead's 1968 release Anthem of the Sun.) After transferring with sophomore standing to the University of California, Berkeley in 1961, he befriended future Grateful Dead keyboardist Tom Constanten before dropping out again after less than a semester. At the behest of Constanten, he studied under the Italian modernist Luciano Berio in a graduate-level course at Mills College in the spring of 1962; their classmates included Steve Reich and Stanford University cross-registrant John Chowning.

While volunteering for KPFA as a recording engineer during this period, he met bluegrass banjo player Jerry Garcia. Despite seemingly opposite musical interests, they soon formed a friendship. Following a brief period as a Post Office Department employee and keno marker in Las Vegas (initially rooming with Constanten, who soon departed to study under Berio and other members of the Darmstadt School in Europe); a second stint with the Post Office in San Francisco; and a collaboration with the likes of Reich, Jon Gibson and Constanten upon the latter's return from Europe under the auspices of the San Francisco Mime Troupe, Lesh was talked into becoming the bassist for Garcia's new rock band (then known as The Warlocks) in the fall of 1964. This was a peculiar turn of events, as Lesh had never before played bass. According to Lesh, the first song he rehearsed with the band was "I Know You Rider". He joined them for their third or fourth gig (memories vary) and stayed until the end.

Since Lesh had never played bass, it meant that to a great extent he learned "on the job", yet it also meant he had no preconceived attitudes about the instrument's traditional rhythm section role. In his autobiography, he credits Jack Casady (who was playing with Jefferson Airplane) as a confirming influence on the direction to which his instincts were leading him. While he has said that his playing style was influenced more by Bach counterpoint than by contemporaneous rock and soul bass players, one can also hear the fluidity and power of a jazz bassist such as Charles Mingus or Jimmy Garrison in Lesh's work, along with stylistic allusions to Casady. Lesh has also cited Jack Bruce of Cream as an influence.

Music 

Lesh was an innovator in the new role that the electric bass developed during the mid-1960s. Contemporaries such as Casady, Bruce, James Jamerson and Paul McCartney adopted a more melodic, contrapuntal approach to the instrument; before this, bass players in rock had generally played a conventional timekeeping role within the beat of the song, and within (or underpinning) the song's harmonic or chord structure.  While not abandoning these aspects, Lesh took his own improvised excursions during a song or instrumental.  This was a characteristic aspect of the so-called San Francisco Sound in the new rock music.  In many Dead jams, Lesh's bass is, in essence, as much a lead instrument as Garcia's guitar.

Lesh was not a prolific composer or singer with the Grateful Dead, although some of the songs he contributed or co-wrote (including "New Potato Caboose", "Box of Rain", "Truckin'", "Unbroken Chain" and "Pride of Cucamonga") are among the best known in the band's repertoire. Lesh's high tenor voice contributed to the Grateful Dead's three-part harmony sections in their group vocals in the early days of the band, until he largely relinquished singing high parts to Donna Godchaux (and thence Brent Mydland and Vince Welnick) in 1976 due to vocal cord damage from improper singing technique. In 1985, he resumed singing lead vocals on select songs as a baritone. Throughout the Grateful Dead's career, his interest in avant-garde music remained a crucial influence on the group.

In 1994, he was inducted into The Rock and Roll Hall of Fame as a member of the Grateful Dead.

Post-Grateful Dead
After the disbanding of the Grateful Dead, Lesh continued to play with its offshoots The Other Ones and The Dead, as well as performing with his own band, Phil Lesh and Friends. In 1999, he co-headlined a tour with Bob Dylan.

Additionally, Lesh and his wife Jill administer their charitable organization, the Unbroken Chain Foundation. The couple have two children together, Grahame and Brian. Both Grahame and Brian follow in their father's musical footsteps. The three frequently play together both publicly and privately, for example in an annual benefit concert grouping known as Philharmonia, dating to 1997, most recently on December 18, 2011 at a Christmas gig including Bob Weir and Jackie Greene at the Tenderloin Middle School cafeteria attended by 250 people.

In 1998, Lesh underwent a liver transplant as a result of chronic hepatitis C infection; since then, he has become an outspoken advocate for organ donor programs and when performing regularly encourages members of the audience to become organ donors (tracks identified as the "donor rap" on the live recordings of his various performances).

In April 2005, Lesh's book Searching for the Sound: My Life with the Grateful Dead was published. The book takes its name from the lyrics of a Grateful Dead song titled "Unbroken Chain," from their album From the Mars Hotel.  "Unbroken Chain" is one of the few songs Lesh sings.  This was the only book about the Grateful Dead written by a member of the band until 2015, when Bill Kreutzmann released his memoir, Deal: My Three Decades of Drumming, Dreams and Drugs with the Grateful Dead.

On October 26, 2006, Lesh released a statement on his official website, revealing that he had been diagnosed with prostate cancer—the disease that killed his father—and would be undergoing an operation in December 2006 to have it removed. On December 7, 2006, Lesh released a statement stating that he had undergone prostate surgery with the cancer being removed.

In 2009, Lesh went back on tour with the remaining members of the Grateful Dead. Following the 2009 summer tour Lesh proceeded to found a new band with Bob Weir named Furthur, which debuted in September 2009.

In 2012, Lesh founded a music venue called Terrapin Crossroads, in San Rafael, California.  The venue officially opened on March 8, 2012, with a first of a run of twelve concerts by Phil Lesh and Friends. When not on tour, Lesh's sons, Grahame and Brian, serve as the house band at Terrapin Crossroads In addition to songs from the Dead catalog, Lesh played material by Mumford & Sons, Zac Brown Band and other contemporary acts with his sons.

Lesh began performing again with Phil Lesh and Friends in 2012. Furthur disbanded in early 2014 and, at age 74, Lesh ceased touring full time. Since then he has performed regularly at Terrapin Crossroads with various Phil Lesh and Friends line-ups as well as with the Terrapin Family Band. He also performs select show at venues throughout the United States, notably the Capitol Theatre, as well as at festivals.

He took part in the 2015 Fare Thee Well concerts, and a short North American tour with Bob Weir in the spring of 2018.

In October 2015, Lesh announced that he had had bladder cancer surgery.  He stated that his prognosis was good and that he expected to make a full recovery.

In August 2019, Lesh announced that he would undergo back surgery, due to which he and his band cancelled upcoming engagements at the Outlaw Music Festival, Telluride Blues & Brews Festival, and Dirt Farmers Festival. He is expected to make a full recovery. Phil and Jill Lesh closed Terrapin Crossroads in November, 2021 when their lease on the property expired.

Discography

The Other Ones:
 The Strange Remain (1999) 
Phil Lesh and Friends:
 Love Will See You Through (1999)
 There and Back Again (2002)
 Live at the Warfield (2006)

Notes

References

Philzone.com—Phil Lesh and Friends fan site
Parker, T. Virgil. "Phil Lesh: All in the Music", College Crier
Phil Lesh and Friends at archive.org

External links

Phil Lesh and Friends official website
 Terrapin Crossroads—Phil Lesh's new music and dining venue in San Rafael, CA (Marin County)
Phil Lesh on the Grateful Dead's Official Site

1940 births
American rock bass guitarists
American male bass guitarists
Berkeley High School (Berkeley, California) alumni
Grateful Dead members
Musicians from the San Francisco Bay Area
Singer-songwriters from California
American rock singers
American male singer-songwriters
American bass guitarists
Liver transplant recipients
Living people
Musicians from Berkeley, California
Guitarists from California
The Other Ones members
New Riders of the Purple Sage members
Furthur (band) members
20th-century American guitarists